Mesobathylebouria is a genus of trematodes in the family Opecoelidae.

Species
Mesobathylebouria acanthogobii (Yamaguti, 1951) Martin, Huston, Cutmore & Cribb, 2018
Mesobathylebouria lanceolata (Price, 1934) Martin, Huston, Cutmore & Cribb, 2018
Mesobathylebouria lobata (Yamaguti, 1934) Martin, Huston, Cutmore & Cribb, 2018
Mesobathylebouria tinkerbellae (Thompson & Margolis, 1987) Martin, Huston, Cutmore & Cribb, 2018
Mesobathylebouria tohei (Yamaguti, 1970) Martin, Huston, Cutmore & Cribb, 2018

References

Opecoelidae
Plagiorchiida genera